James Pimm (1798–1866) was a British food proprietor who created the gin-based liqueur known as Pimm's.

Pimm was born and raised in Newnham, Kent as the son of James Norris Pimm, a tenant farmer, and his wife Susannah. He was classically educated in Edinburgh, Scotland, where he focused his studies on Theology. In his early 20s, he moved to London where he established himself as a shellfish monger, the first step on a career in catering.  The royal family were frequent patrons. The same year, Pimm married Mary Southernden Mallery at St Mary Woolnoth, London. Within ten years he was running a chain of five restaurants patronized by the rest of the British gentry and hoi polloi. Pimm and his wife Mary had at least 11 children, however, few reached adulthood.

Pimm devised the cocktail to accompany the shellfish; the recipe was a closely guarded secret then, and remains so to this day. The owners now are Diageo PLC.

Pimm died on 16 August 1866 at the family home in East Peckham, Kent, although he was still known to be residing in addresses in The City of London around the time of his death. He is buried at Holy Trinity Church, East Peckham, Kent, England.

Sources 
How a Farmer’s Son Invented the Taste of the Social Summer, by Mark Gardner, Faversham Times, 25 June 2005

1798 births
1873 deaths
English restaurateurs
People from Newnham, Kent
English inventors
People from East Peckham
19th-century British businesspeople